OWSLA is an American record label founded by Skrillex and co-founded by Tim Smith, Kathryn Frazier, and Clayton Blaha in 2011. With releases such as Porter Robinson's Spitfire EP, Zedd’s Shave It, Gesaffelstein’s Pursuit and What So Not’s Jaguar. On July 18, 2013 Bromance Records partners up with OWSLA to create an American branch titled Bromance US. Through the partnership they released Gesaffelstein's debut album Aleph on October 28, 2013.

This is a list of releases from OWSLA and its sister labels.

OWSLA discography

Free downloads

NEST discography

Bromance US discography

References

Discographies of American record labels
Owsla